Century 21 Real Estate LLC is an American real estate agent franchise company founded in 1971. The system consists of approximately 14,000 independently owned and operated franchised broker offices in 86 countries and territories worldwide with over 147,000 sales professionals. Century 21 Real Estate is headquartered in Madison, New Jersey.

The first Century 21 office in Canada opened its doors in British Columbia in February 1976.

History 
Century 21 Real Estate (Century 21) was founded in 1971 by two real estate agents, Art Bartlett and Marsh Fisher, in Orange County, California.

Here Bartlett reveals how they decided on the name:

Century 21 was acquired by Trans World Corporation in 1979, when Trans World Corporation decided to focus on hospitality and housing. In 1985, MetLife acquired Century 21 from Trans World Corporation. When MetLife decided to leave the housing business, Century 21 was sold to Hospitality Franchise Systems (later Cendant) in 1995. When Cendant split in 2006, Century 21 became part of Realogy, now Anywhere Real Estate.

See also 
Real estate broker
Real estate trends
Realtor

References

External links

Real estate companies established in 1971
Franchises
Real estate services companies of the United States
Property agencies of Hong Kong
Realogy brands
Companies based in Morris County, New Jersey
History of Orange County, California
Madison, New Jersey
Private equity portfolio companies
Apollo Global Management companies
1971 establishments in California